The R323 road is a regional road in County Mayo, Ireland. Going from west to east, the route connects the towns of Kiltimagh, Knock, and Ballyhaunis. En route it crosses over the N17 national primary road at a grade separated junction in the village of Knock. 

The official description of the R323 from the Roads Act 1993 (Classification of Regional Roads) Order 2006  reads:

R323 Kiltimagh - Knock - Ballyhaunis, County Mayo

Between its junction with R320 at Main Street Kiltimagh and its junction with N60 at Hazelhill in the town of Ballyhaunis via Thomas Street at Kiltimagh; Roosky, Cloonlee, Knock, Greenwood, Tooraree; and Relief Road in the town of Ballyhaunis all in the county of Mayo.

See also
List of roads of County Mayo
National primary road
National secondary road
Roads in Ireland

References

Regional roads in the Republic of Ireland
Roads in County Mayo